Lists of Padma Bhushan award recipients cover people who have received the Padma Bhushan award from the Republic of India for "distinguished service of a high order...without distinction of race, occupation, position or sex." The lists are organized by period.

 List of Padma Bhushan award recipients (1954–1959)
 List of Padma Bhushan award recipients (1960–1969)
 List of Padma Bhushan award recipients (1970–1979)
 List of Padma Bhushan award recipients (1980–1989)
 List of Padma Bhushan award recipients (1990–1999)
 List of Padma Bhushan award recipients (2000–2009)
 List of Padma Bhushan award recipients (2010–2019)
 List of Padma Bhushan award recipients (2020–2029)